The Best of the Beach Boys Vol. 3 is the third in a series of compilations of hits by The Beach Boys, released on August 5, 1968 through Capitol Records. The album was primarily assembled to compensate for the poor U.S. sales of the group's Friends album. Best of the Beach Boys hit number 153 in the US during a 6-week chart stay. In the UK, it reached number 9.

Track listing

British version
The British version of The Best of The Beach Boys Vol. 3 was released in mid-1968 with 14 songs, instead of the 11 found on American version.
Side 1
"Do It Again" – 2:18
"The Warmth of the Sun" – 2:52
"409" – 1:58
"Catch a Wave" – 2:08
"The Lonely Sea" – 2:23
"Long Tall Texan" – 2:27
"Wild Honey" – 2:36
Side 2
"Darlin'" – 2:11
"Please Let Me Wonder" – 2:44
"Let Him Run Wild" – 2:21
"Country Air" – 2:19
"I Know There's an Answer" – 3:08
"Friends" – 2:32
"Heroes and Villains" – 3:36

References

1968 greatest hits albums
The Beach Boys compilation albums
Capitol Records compilation albums